Simone Resta (born 14 September 1970) is an Italian engineer who is currently the technical director for the Haas F1 Team. He previously worked at Scuderia Ferrari from 2001 to 2018, and from 2019 to 2020, as a senior design engineer, head of the R&D department, deputy chief design director and from 2014 to 2018, as Chief Designer.

Career
Resta obtained the master's degree in mechanical engineering at the University of Bologna in 1995, and worked for Minardi in the research and development department since 1998.

In 2001, he moved to Scuderia Ferrari as a senior design engineer. In 2006, he became the head of the research and development department before being promoted to the deputy chief design director in 2012. In 2014, he was appointed by Sergio Marchionne as the team's new chief designer.

On 28 May 2018, Resta left Ferrari to join Alfa Romeo (then known as Sauber), working as the team's technical director. However, he returned to Ferrari on 1 August 2019.

Resta moved to Haas F1 Team for the 2021 Formula One season, as part of a tightening in the technological relationship between Haas and Ferrari.

References

1970 births
Living people
Ferrari people
Formula One designers
Italian automotive engineers
Italian motorsport people
People from Imola
University of Bologna alumni
Alfa Romeo people
Haas F1 Team